Sir Michael Anthony Epstein  (born 18 May 1921) is a British pathologist and academic. He is one of the discoverers of the Epstein–Barr virus, along with Yvonne Barr and Bert Achong.

Personal life
Epstein was born on 18 May 1921, and educated at St Paul's School in London, Trinity College, Cambridge, and Middlesex Hospital Medical School.

In 2006, Epstein was awarded a D.Sc. from Bristol. Epstein turned 100 in May 2021. He is a Patron of Humanists UK.

Career
Epstein was Professor of Pathology, 1968–1985 (now professor emeritus), head of department, 1968–1982 at the University of Bristol. In 1979 he was elected a Fellow of the Royal Society of London and was its vice-president from 1986 to 1991. He was awarded its Royal Medal in 1992. Epstein was awarded the CBE in 1985, and knighted in 1991. He was a fellow of Wolfson College, Oxford, from 1986 until 2001, and has been an honorary fellow since 2001. Epstein was also a founding Fellow of the Academy of Medical Sciences in 1998.

Burkitt lymphoma studies
Epstein was the first person to propose that Burkitt's lymphoma was a cancer caused by a virus. Upon hearing a lecture given by Denis Parsons Burkitt in 1961 about this newly described cancer, Epstein changed his research focus from cancer causing viruses in chickens to searching for a viral origin of Burkitt's lymphoma. After more than two years of working with tumour cells from Burkitt's patients and subsequently working to isolate a virus from them, the Epstein–Barr virus was finally discovered in February 1964.

References

External links 
 Epstein-Barr virus, Sir Anthony Epstein FRS

1921 births
Living people
People educated at St Paul's School, London
Alumni of Trinity College, Cambridge
20th-century British biologists
Academics of the University of Bristol
British humanists
British Jews
British virologists
Commanders of the Order of the British Empire
English centenarians
Fellows of the Academy of Medical Sciences (United Kingdom)
Fellows of the Royal Society
Jewish scientists
Knights Bachelor
Men centenarians
Royal Medal winners